Darryl Gee (born June 6, 1963) is a retired American soccer player who played professionally in the North American Soccer League and Major Indoor Soccer League.  He coaches youth soccer in Maryland.

Gee grew up in Columbia, Maryland where he was an outstanding high school soccer player for the Oakland Mills High School boys team.  He scored 52 goals in 31 games during his junior and senior seasons at Oakland Mills, and was named to the 1980 Baltimore Sun High School Athlete of the Year, attracting the attention of scouts from the North American Soccer League.

After finishing high school, Gee played for the U.S. Olympic soccer team which qualified for the 1980 Summer Olympics.  Gee scored a goal during the regional qualification round, which the U.S. won.  However, due to the United States' boycott of the Olympics, held in the Soviet Union, Gee and his team mates were unable to compete.

Gee would go on to play for the U-20 national team at the regional qualification tournament for the 1981 FIFA World Youth Championship, to be held in Australia. The U.S. team easily handled its opponents, losing only to Mexico 2-0 in the final game.  In Australia, the team did poorly, losing to Uruguay 3-0 and Poland 4-0 and tying Qatar 1-1.  They then toured China, defeating Australia 2-1, but losing to China 5-1 and Egypt 1-0.

With an impressive resume at the junior level, the Minnesota Kicks of the North American Soccer League drafted Gee out of high school.  The Kicks then traded Gee to the New York Cosmos in exchange for the Cosmos first and second round draft picks.   However, he was unable to break into the starting lineup until June 1982.  On September 28, 1982, the Cosmos played a farewell match against Brazilian club Flamengo in honor of Cosmos and Flamengo great Carlos Alberto.  In that game, Alberto played the first half for the Cosmos.  At half time, he gave Gee his jersey, then played the second half for Flamengo.  Gee remained with the Cosmos, playing both indoor and outdoor seasons, until the team folded in 1984.  In December 1987, Gee signed with the Maryland Bays of the American Soccer League.  In 1990, the Bays took the APSL title.  Gee retired from playing in 1992.

In 1999, he coached the Maryland Mania of the USL A-League in that team's single season of existence.

He runs the Darryl Gee Soccer Academy in Gaithersburg, Maryland.

Gee was inducted into the Maryland Soccer Hall of Fame.

References

External links
 NASL/MISL stats
 

1963 births
Living people
American soccer coaches
American soccer players
American Soccer League (1988–89) players
American Professional Soccer League players
Los Angeles Lazers players
Major Indoor Soccer League (1978–1992) players
Maryland Bays players
North American Soccer League (1968–1984) indoor players
New York Cosmos players
North American Soccer League (1968–1984) players
USL First Division coaches
Washington Diplomats (1988–1990) players
Soccer players from Maryland
United States men's under-20 international soccer players
Association football defenders